Richard-Stanislas Cooke (January 23, 1850 – July 10, 1924) was a politician from Quebec, Canada.

Background

He was born on January 23, 1850, in Trois-Rivières, Mauricie.  He was a lawyer.  He was married to Marie-Sara-Henriette-Louise Lajoie in 1877 and to Florence Genest in 1889.

Mayor of Trois-Rivières

He was a Council member from 1880 to 1886 and from 1888 to 1889 and Mayor of Trois-Rivières from 1896 to 1898.

Member of the legislature

He ran as a Liberal candidate in the district of Trois-Rivières in the 1892 general election and the by-election held in that same year.  Each time he lost.

He was elected in 1900, but did not run for re-election in 1904.

Retirement from Politics

Cooke was appointed judge in 1904.  He died on July 10, 1924.

References

1850 births
1924 deaths
Quebec Liberal Party MNAs
Mayors of Trois-Rivières